Dayanand Raghunath Sopte is an Indian politician and former member of Goa Legislative Assembly from Mandrem assembly constituency.

References

Living people
Bharatiya Janata Party politicians from Goa
21st-century Indian politicians
1964 births
Former members of Indian National Congress from Goa